Caryophyllaeides is a genus of flatworms belonging to the family Lytocestidae.

Species:
 Caryophyllaeides ergensi Scholz, 1990 
 Caryophyllaeides fennicus (Schneider, 1902) 
 Caryophyllaeides skrjabini Popoff, 1922

References

Platyhelminthes